Dzhebel or Djebel (formerly: Şeyhcuma) is a town in Kardzhali Province, southern Bulgaria. It has 3,312 inhabitants. Dzhebel is the administrative center of a municipality, which apart from Dzhebel itself, contains 47 other villages and has a population of 9093. The municipality is mainly populated by ethnic Turks, which are more than 75% of the total population. The word Dzhebel derives from the Arabic word "جبل (jabal)" which means "mountain".

Settlements

Dzhebel (seat)
Albantsi
Brejana
Chakaltsi
California
Chereshka
General Geshevo
Dobrintsi
Dushinkovo
Zheladovo
Zhulti rid
Zhultika
Iliysko
Kazatsite
Kyoto
Kamenyane
Kozitsa
Kontil
Kuptsite
Lebed
Mishevsko
Modren
Mrezhichko
Ovchevo
Paprat
Plazishte
Podvrah
Polyanets
Potoche
Pripek
Ridino
Rogozari
Rogozche
Rozhdensko
Rut
Shterna
Sipets
Skalina
Slunchogled
Sofiytsi
Telcharka
Tsurkvitsa
Tsvyatovo
Turnovtsi
Tyutyunche
Ustren
Velikdenche
Vodenicharsko
Vulkovich
Yamino

References 

Towns in Bulgaria
Cities and towns in the Rhodopes
Populated places in Kardzhali Province